Gary Jacques van Aswegen (born 18 February 1990) is a South African former rugby union player that played as a fly-half throughout his career. He retired after the 2015 season, aged 25.

Rugby career

Youth

Van Aswegen was included in a number of youth sides for local province side the  while playing rugby for Hoërskool Standerton. He represented them at the 2006 Under-16 Grant Khomo Week tournament, the 2007 Under-18 Academy Week tournament and the 2008 Under-18 Craven Week tournament. He was named Player of the Day on the second matchday of the competition after scoring a kick in the final minute of their match against  to secure a 19–17 victory for the team from Mpumalanga. He was then named in the northern Under–18 Elite squad after the tournament.

In 2009, Van Aswegen moved to Cape Town to join . He played for the  side during the 2009 Under-19 Provincial Championship and earned an inclusion in the South African Under-20 side that played their Argentinean counterparts in 2010. He also joined a training for the South African Under-20s prior to the 2010 IRB Junior World Championship, but failed to make the final squad.

Western Province / Stormers

In addition to his points-scoring exploits for the Under-21 side, Van Aswegen also made his first class debut in September 2010. He made his home debut against , once again coming on as a second-half substitute and scoring one conversion.

In 2011, with just the two first class games under his belt, Van Aswegen also earned his inclusion in the  squad for the 2011 Super Rugby season. Van Aswegen kicked three penalties before being replaced by Grant just after the hour mark as the Stormers ran out 19–16 winners.

Van Aswegen returned from his knee injury during the 2011 Currie Cup Premier Division competition to start their match against , scoring sixteen points in a 26–26 draw, but was once again forced to limp off in the final minute of the match. He once again suffered a tear in the same ligament as before, ruling him out of rugby for the remainder of 2011.

Van Aswegen recovered in time for the start of the 2012 Super Rugby season and started the first two matches of the campaign with Peter Grant once again only returning from Japan shortly before the start of the season. After one more Currie Cup appearance against , yet another knee injury ended his 2012 campaign.

In 2013, Van Aswegen put his injury problems behind him and, after playing three matches in the 2013 Vodacom Cup competition and scoring 27 points, he joined up with the  side once more. He made nine appearances during the 2013 Super Rugby season, contributing 15 points with the boot. A further four appearances followed during the 2013 Currie Cup Premier Division competition, with Van Aswegen scoring 22 points before another knee injury saw him miss the rest of the season.

While being included in their squad, he dropped down to the Vodacom Cup squad for the 2014 Vodacom Cup. He started seven out of their eight matches in the competition, contributing 38 points.

Eastern Province Kings

In June 2014, the  announced that Van Aswegen would join them on a one-month trial prior to the 2014 Currie Cup Premier Division competition. He successfully concluded the trial and signed a deal with the Port Elizabeth-based side until 2016.

Van Aswegen started eight matches for the Eastern Province Kings during the 2014 Currie Cup. He made his debut for his new side against his former side, Western Province, in a 16–35 defeat. He finished the season with 30 points, the second-highest by an Eastern Province Kings player behind Scott van Breda and sixteenth overall.

The injury ruled him out of the remainder of the 2015 Vodacom Cup competition, plus the entire 2015 Currie Cup Premier Division.

Retirement

He suffered a series of knee injuries during his career, which saw him undergo six knee operations, prior to his retirement from rugby, which saw him take up other business interests.

Statistics

External links

References

Living people
1990 births
South African rugby union players
Stormers players
Western Province (rugby union) players
Rugby union fly-halves
Rugby union players from Pretoria
White South African people